The Collingwood Blues were a Junior "A" ice hockey team from Collingwood, Ontario, Canada.  They were a part of the Ontario Junior A Hockey League and earlier the Central Junior B Hockey League.

History
Founded as a Jr ‘B’ team in 1948-49, the Greenshirts dropped down to Jr ‘C’ in 1949-50, although they played in a mixed
league of B and C teams during the regular season. Collingwood junior hockey excellence can be traced back as far as 1950 where the town's Junior "C" team won four straight Clarence Schmalz Cups as All-Ontario Junior "C" Champions. Subsequently, they were named the OHA’s Jr ‘C’ Team of the Century.

The Blues played in the Georgia Bay Jr.C league until 1969, when they joined the Central Ontario Jr.B league.  They won the Central Junior B Hockey League playoff championship in 1970 and 1971.  In 1972, after transferring to the Mid-Ontario Junior B League, they won their league title. They won that title again in 1975-76 and advanced through the Ontario playdowns all the way to the Sutherland Cup provincial final against the St. Marys Lincolns of the Western Junior B Hockey League. St. Marys won the series 4-3, handing Collingwood their only home defeat of the season, in game 7 of the finals.

The Blues played in the Southern Ontario Junior A Hockey League in 1976-77 and finished third out of four teams.  In 1977, the Collingwood Blues informed the SOJHL that they were no longer interested in Junior A hockey and left the league to join the local Junior C loop.  The folding of the Blues allowed for the folding of the SOJHL.  The next season the team was called the Glassmen and compete at the Junior C level.  In 1979, the team changed their name to the Shipbuilders and jumped to the Major Intermediate A Hockey League.  The Shipbuilder were 1982-83 Major Int. "A" Champions and second place in the province to a team from Timmins, Ontario.  In 1983, the league was promoted to Senior "A".  The team left the league in 1987 and went on hiatus.  In their final Senior season they dropped down to the Georgian Bay Senior A Hockey League.  They finished second in the regular season behind the Durham Huskies, but they won the league playoffs and the OHA Senior "A" title 4-games-to-2 against the Dunnville Mudcats of the Southern Ontario league.

In 1988, the Blues were voted back into the Central Junior B Hockey League. In 1993, the league was promoted to Junior A status and the Blues remained a member of that league until 2011.

In 2010, the Blues changed their name to the Blackhawks.  On April 3, 2011, the League announced that the franchise had ceased operations.

Season-by-season results

Original junior team

The Shipbuilders

The second junior team

Playoffs
SOJHL Years
1977 Lost Final
Collingwood Blues defeated Hamilton Mountain A's 4-games-to-2
Guelph Platers defeated Collingwood Blues 4-games-to-none

OPJHL Years

Sutherland Cup appearances
1976: St. Marys Lincolns defeated Collingwood Blues 4-games-to-3

Notable alumni
 Aaron Downey
 Kevin Colley
 Curtis Sanford
 Kerry Fraser
 Matt Beleskey

References

External links
Blues Website
Aaron Downey's profile at www.legendsofhockey.net

Ontario Provincial Junior A Hockey League teams
1988 establishments in Ontario
2011 disestablishments in Ontario
Ice hockey clubs established in 1988
Ice hockey clubs disestablished in 2011